Eleutheromania, or eleutherophilia is "a mania or frantic zeal for freedom". Some usages of the term make it sound like it could be used in a medical context with a hint of an irrational disorder, such as John G Robertson's definition that described it as a mad zeal or irresistible craving for freedom. However other usages assign to the term normal human emotional responses such as a mere passion for liberty. Individuals with this condition are called eleutheromaniacs. An antonym for the term is eleutherophobia. An individual that fears freedom is an eleutherophobe.

References

Mania
Youth empowerment